The Transformers: Devastation is a six-issue comic book miniseries, published by IDW Publishing, based on the Transformers and following on from The Transformers: Escalation. Issue 1 of Devastation was released on October 3, 2007, with issue 2 following on the 24th of October  and was published monthly until February 2008.  A follow-up entitled The Transformers: Revelation then followed. The series is available in The Transformers: Volume 3.

Plot

Notes
As with Escalation, Devastation picks up on several other plot threads introduced in other IDW G1 stories.

In relation to The Transformers: Spotlight
 Scorponok, here revealed as the "Head" of the Machination, was introduced in Spotlight: Ultra Magnus. Likewise, the concept of "transformable men" was also introduced in that story, which here evolves into the Headmaster process.
 Soundwave was trapped in his alt-mode by Bludgeon in Spotlight: Soundwave. This is his first in-continuity appearance since.
 The story of Sixshot and the Reapers was first explored in Spotlight: Sixshot.
 The Dead Universe storyline has been referred to Spotlight one-shots focusing on Nightbeat, Galvatron, Optimus Prime, and Arcee. Nightbeat had his memory tampered with in his own Spotlight and was asked to investigate Leadfoot's death in Galvatron. Nova/Nemesis Prime's background was detailed in Optimus Prime, as was that of Jhiaxus.
 Dealer/Doubledealer was introduced in Spotlight: Hot Rod as a Decepticon spy tasked to retrieve a powerful object called the Magnificence from Hot Rod.
The events that cause Prime to pull out of Earth are detailed in Spotlight: Arcee, where the Decepticons take the Monstructor components from Garrus-9.

In relation to The Transformers: Escalation
 The Dinobots and Shockwave were taken by Skywatch in issue 5 of Escalation and are still being excavated as Grimlock is reactivated here.
 Sunstreaker and Hunter were abducted by the Machination in issue 1 of Escalation, but their overall fate was not expanded on until Devastation.

In relation to The Transformers: Infiltration
 In issue 1, Nightbeat explains the events of the first three issues of Infiltration as a plot by the Machination to acquire a Transformer, locating them via a homing device in the computer from that story.
 Starscream's return here marks his first appearance since issue 6 of Infiltration, where he was blown almost in half after a failed power play against Megatron.

References

2007 comics debuts
2008 comics endings
Devastation
IDW Publishing titles
Comic book limited series